Forestry and Land Scotland (FLS) was formed on 1 April 2019 and is responsible for managing and promoting the National Forest Estate in Scotland. The national forest estate owned by FLS covers 6,400 km2, being roughly 8% of the land area of Scotland. Around two-thirds of this land is forested, with the remaining land consisting of a mixture of agricultural land and open areas such as moorland.

As of January 2020 there were 307 individual forests listed on the FLS website; there are also 6 designated forest parks.

List of Forests

References

Forestry in Scotland
Forests and woodlands of Scotland